Hillary Mutyambai is a former Inspector-General of police in Kenya.

Security Affairs 
 In 1991, he joined the police service as a junior officer before being promoted to Superintendent of police.
 He was the Deputy director of  National Intelligence Service (Kenya) before becoming an IG.

Personal life 
He is married to Susan Nzioki and they have  two children  David and Lucy.

References 

Living people
Kenyan police officers
1964 births